Support Command may refer to:

 Support Command (Albania)
 Support Command (New Zealand)
 Support Command (British Army)
 RAF Support Command
 RAAF Support Command